Pygame is a cross-platform set of Python modules designed for writing video games. It includes computer graphics and sound libraries designed to be used with the Python programming language.

History
Pygame was originally written by Pete Shinners to replace PySDL after its development stalled. It has been a community project since 2000 and is released under the free software GNU Lesser General Public License (which "provides for Pygame to be distributed with open source and commercial software").

Development of Version 2
Pygame version 2 was planned as "Pygame Reloaded" in 2009, but development and maintenance of Pygame completely stopped until the end of 2016 with version 1.9.1. After the release of version 1.9.5 in March 2019, development of a new version 2 is active on the roadmap.

Pygame 2.0 released on 28 October, 2020, on Pygame's 20th birthday.

Features
Pygame uses the Simple DirectMedia Layer (SDL) library, with the intention of allowing real-time computer game development without the low-level mechanics of the C programming language and its derivatives. This is based on the assumption that the most expensive functions inside games can be abstracted from the game logic, making it possible to use a high-level programming language, such as Python, to structure the game.

Other features that SDL does have include vector math, collision detection, 2D sprite scene graph management, MIDI support, camera, pixel-array manipulation, transformations, filtering, advanced freetype font support, and drawing.

Applications using Pygame can run on Android phones and tablets with the use of Pygame Subset for Android (pgs4a). Sound, vibration, keyboard, and accelerometer are supported on Android.

Community

There is a regular competition, called PyWeek, to write games using Python (and usually but not necessarily, Pygame). The community has created many tutorials for Pygame.

Notable games using Pygame
 Frets on Fire
 Dangerous High School Girls in Trouble
 Save the Date, IndieCade 2013 Finalist
 Drawn Down Abyss

See also

 Cocos2d
 Panda3D
 Pyglet

Notes

References

External links
 
 Pygame newsgroup (web access) - the "official" Pygame newsgroup, requires registration
 Pygame Subset for Android (PGS4A)
 pyOpenGL - Python OpenGL Bindings
 Pygame-SDL2 - a reimplementation of Pygame APIs on top of SDL2
 PySDL2 - a wrapper around the SDL2 library similar to the discontinued PySDL project

Application programming interfaces
Free computer libraries
Free software programmed in Python
Graphics libraries
Linux APIs
MacOS APIs
Python (programming language) libraries
Simple DirectMedia Layer
Video game development software
Video game development software for Linux
Windows APIs